Bus Gordon was an American Negro league second baseman in the 1920s.

Gordon played for the Kansas City Monarchs in 1920. In ten recorded games, he posted seven hits in 40 plate appearances.

References

External links
 and Seamheads

Year of birth missing
Year of death missing
Place of birth missing
Place of death missing
Kansas City Monarchs players